Wendy Robie is an American actress. She is best known for her role as Nadine Hurley in David Lynch's television series Twin Peaks (1990–1991) and the prequel film Twin Peaks: Fire Walk with Me (1992). She also starred in two of Wes Craven's films: The People Under the Stairs (1991) and Vampire in Brooklyn (1995). In 2017, Robie reprised her role as Nadine in David Lynch's revival series Twin Peaks: The Return.

Early life 
Robie grew up on a northern California ranch where Arabian horses were raised. Before her big break on Twins Peaks, Robie lived in Seattle, working in repertory theatre. She only began fulfilling her lifelong dream of acting after teaching college English for a decade while she raised her daughter, Samantha.

Career
In 1990, Robie made her acting debut as Nadine Hurley in David Lynch's television series Twin Peaks. She appeared in 22 episodes. In 1991, Robie guest starred on an episode of Baywatch and portrayed the villainous Woman in Wes Craven's horror film The People Under The Stairs. In comparing Lynch and Craven, Robie remarked that both were "kind people with wonderful imaginations who work out their views of the darkness in the world through their art."

The following year, Robie reprised her role as Nadine in David Lynch's prequel film Twin Peaks: Fire Walk with Me (1992), although her scene was deleted. The same year, she guest starred on an episode of the television series Quantum Leap. In 1993, Robie starred in the television film Prophet of Evil: The Ervil LeBaron Story.

In 1994, she guest starred in the television series Viper and Ultraman: The Ultimate Hero before appearing in the television film A Place for Annie. In 1995, Robie had a cameo role in Wes Craven's horror comedy film Vampire in Brooklyn. The same year, she had guest roles on the television series Sister, Sister and Star Trek: Deep Space Nine.

In 1996, Robie made her voice-over debut in the video game Zork: Nemesis. The same year, Robie had a guest role on the television series Dark Skies and a supporting role in the film The Glimmer Man. In 1998, she played Bernice in the horror film The Dentist 2, Harriet Davidson in the television series C-16: FBI, and had a supporting role in the film Devil in the Flesh. In 2014, Robie's deleted scene from Fire Walk With Me was included in Lynch's film Twin Peaks: The Missing Pieces. In 2017, Robie reprised her role as Nadine in David Lynch's revival series Twin Peaks: The Return.

Filmography
Twin Peaks as Nadine Hurley (22 episodes, 1990–1991)
Baywatch as June Reed (1 episode, 1991)
The People Under the Stairs (1991) as Mrs. Robeson; "Mommy"
Twin Peaks: Fire Walk with Me (1992) (scenes deleted) as Nadine Hurley
Quantum Leap as Mrs. Takin (1 episode, 1992)
Prophet of Evil: The Ervil LeBaron Story (1993) (TV)
Ultraman: The Ultimate Hero (1 episode, 1994)
Viper as Nurse (1 episode, 1994)
A Place for Annie (1994) (TV) as Dr. Horton
Vampire in Brooklyn (1995) as Zealot at Police Station
Star Trek: Deep Space Nine as Ulani (Episode: "Destiny", 1995)
Sister, Sister as Mrs. Cathcart (1 episode, 1995)
Zork: Nemesis (1996) (VG) as Insane Patient
The Glimmer Man (1996) as Melanie Sardes
Dark Skies as Kate Balfour (1 episode, 1996)
Devil in the Flesh (1998) (V) as Joyce Saunders
C-16: FBI as Harriet Davidson (1 episode, 1998)
The Dentist 2 (1998) as Bernice
Romeo and Juliet (2000) (V) as Prince
Party of Five as Elaine (1 episode, 2000)
Any Day Now as Trish (1 episode, 2000)
The Magnificent Seven as Nun (1 episode, 2000)
The Attic Expeditions (2001) as Dr. Thalama
Lost Voyage (2001) (TV) as Mary Burnett
Fairies (short film, predecessor to Were the World Mine, 2003) as Ms. Tebbit
Were the World Mine (2008) as Ms. Tebbit
Twin Peaks: The Return as Nadine Hurley (5 episodes, 2017)
Dreaming Grand Avenue (2020) as Andromeda
Relative (2022) as Karen Frank

Awards and nominations

Theatre

Film

References

External links
 

Living people
American film actresses
American television actresses
Actresses from Cincinnati
21st-century American women
Year of birth missing (living people)